Vasilis Karras (born Vasilis Kesoglidis on 12 November 1953) is a Greek folk singer.

Biography
Karras was born in Kokkinohori, near Kavala, Greece. At the age of 10, his family moved to Thessaloniki. Also around this time his brother Damian and his sister Anastasia were born. Growing up in the streets of Thessaloniki allowed Karras considerable independence and many of the friendships he created there have lasted well into his life until now.

In the summer of 1969, Karras made a brief appearance at the club "Prosfygas" in Evosmos, Thessaloniki and made an immediate impact. Even though he was only 16 years old, he became a favourite in the city suburbs due to his distinctive then raspy voice. The club owners allowed Vasilis to sing on many more occasions, and thus a legend was born. The audience in his home city took a particular liking in his style.

In the 1970s, Karras cemented his reputation as a young upstart on the Greek 'laika' (folk songs) stage singing throughout Northern Greece and towards the end of the decade had begun to develop his own repertoire, working with song writers and also creating his own work.

In 1980, his first album Alismonites Ores was released which set Karras on the long path towards fame and recognition. It was also at this time that Vasilis decided to devote his life and career to folk music and sing professionally.

By the 1990s, his unique style and appeal to the Greek public catapulted Karras to national stardom. Partnerships with Michalis Rakintzis, Zafeiris Melas and Konstantina also furthered his reputation in Greece. In 1996, Karras contacted acclaimed songwriter Phoebus with the prospect of creating an album based on his songs. Phoebus responded positively and enthusiastically went to work creating songs that fit Vasilis' unique style and complemented his singing abilities. The result was the hit album Tilefonise Mou which went two time platinum and is Karras' all time best-seller. This album also started a new era for Vasilis: the introduction of a modern, western upbeat style to his music, which complemented his bouzouki-based folk/dance songs. It would become a style that Vasilis would perfect for many years to come and adopt prominently in his discography from then on.

Vasilis and Phoebus also partnered for the 1999 hit album Epistrefo, a perennial mainstay in his club repertoire, with many hit singles.

Around this time, Karras also worked with many young Greek talents in efforts to help their career. In particular, after spotting Despina Malea (now known as Despina Vandi), he offered her the chance to sing at his night club for the whole summer season, thus kick-starting her career. Vasilis and Despina would have the chance to work together later on in 2005 in a few duets from the music of common friend Phoebus.

Vasilis Karras is regarded as a legend of folk music in Greece. Apart from continuing his discography, he also continues to sing at nightclubs in Athens and Thessaloniki and also travels around the globe to centres of the Greek diaspora, including the United States, (Germany), Australia and Canada. The audiences abroad have also taken a particular liking to his music, and Vasilis has many loyal fans outside of Greece.

Recently he has partnered with other mainstays of the Greek music scene such as Tolis Voskopoulos, Christos Dantis, Eirini Merkouri, Kostas Karafotis, Despina Vandi and others, writing and performing many duets in their respective albums.

His latest album was released in early 2020, titled Rotas An Se Eho Erotefthi. Vasilis Karras' widespread appeal and numerous decades on the Greek music scene have cemented his legend as one of the top Greek folk singers ever, but it his laid back and accessible personality that has endeared him to others throughout the music industry and to the fans through the country and abroad. Vasilis is credited as the last singing survivors of the 'Kapsourika' style of songs in Greece, namely love songs about lost loves and reminiscing.
Throughout his career he emphasized his love for his hometown and has written and sung many songs about Thessaloniki reminiscing about his childhood and early loves including "Den Pao Pouthena", "Nychta Kselogiastra", "Erhomai" and "Gia Afto Stasou". His 1987 album Apo ti Thessaloniki me agapi and his 1988 work Mia bradia sti Thessaloniki are examples of the special place the city has in his heart.

Discography
 Alismonites ores (1980)
 Ti les kale (1982)
 Giati na horisoume (1984)
 Mi hathis (1985)
 Apo ti Thessaloniki me agapi (1987)
 Apoklistika gia sena (1988)
 Afti h nyxta (1989)
 Eisai pantou (1990)
 Lege oti thes (1991)
 Asteria tou Borra (1991)
 Den pao pouthena (1992)
 Tragoudia ap'to sirtari (1992)
 Nichta xelogiastra (1993)
 Pos tolmas (1993)
 O ilios tou himona me melagholi (1993)
 Sti Saliniki mia fora (1994)
 Hreose to se mena (1994)
 Mia bradia sta nea dilina (1995)
 10 xronia (1995)
 Ftes esi (1995)
 Tilefonise mou (1996)
 Erhome (1996) (Song: To dilitirio)
 M'echis kani aliti (1997)
 S'ena bradi oti zisoume (1997)
 Brechi sti Thessaloniki (1997)
 Fenomeno (1998)-CD Single
 Astin na leei (1999)
 Epistrefo (1999)
 20 xronia (1999)
 I megaliteres epitichies (2000)
 Mabri lista (2000)
 Girise (2001)
 Ta dika mou tragoudia (2002)
 Logia tis nichtas (2002)'
 Pare to dromo ke ela (2003) Basilis Karras DVD (2004) Telos (2004) Ola ena psema (2005) Oneira (2007) Ola mou ta hronia live (2008) Opos palia (2009) Έτσι Λαϊκά (Etsi Laika) (2012) Kirios ma ke alitis (Κύριος μα και...αλήτης)'' (2013)
Ta Kalutera Taxidia 2016
Alhth me lene 2017

References

External links
Official website

1953 births
Living people
Greek laïko singers
20th-century Greek male singers
Minos EMI artists
Singers from Thessaloniki
Eastern Orthodox Christians from Greece
Greek Macedonians
People from Kavala (regional unit)